Monarch is an unincorporated community and a U.S. Post Office located near Monarch Pass in Chaffee County, Colorado, United States.  The Monarch U.S. Post Office has the ZIP Code 81227.

Geography

See also

References

External links

Unincorporated communities in Chaffee County, Colorado
Unincorporated communities in Colorado